Gromkiy is a  of the Russian Navy.

Development and design 

The Steregushchiy-class corvettes have a steel hull and composite material superstructure, with a bulbous bow and nine watertight subdivisions. They have a combined bridge and command centre, and space and weight provision for eight SS-N-25 missiles. Stealth technology was widely used during construction of the ships, as well as 21 patents and 14 new computer programs. Newest physical field reduction solutions were applied too. As a result, designers considerably reduced the ship's radar signature thanks to hull architecture and fire-resistant radar-absorbent fiberglass applied in tophamper's design.

The Kashtan CIWS on the first ship was replaced in subsequent vessels by 12 Redut VLS cells containing 9M96E medium-range SAMs of the S-400 system. SS-N-27 (Kalibr type missiles) will be fitted to a larger domestic version, Project 20385.

The export version known as Project 20382 Tigr carries either eight supersonic SS-N-26 (P-800 Oniks) anti-ship missiles or sixteen subsonic SS-N-25 'Switchblade' (Kh-35E Uran). It also carries two twin-tube launchers for 533mm heavy torpedoes. The A-190E 100mm gun first used in the s is controlled by a 5P-10E system that can track four targets simultaneously. Protection from air attacks is provided by the Kashtan CIWS and eight mounts for the SA-N-10 'Grouse' (9K38 Igla) SAM.

Construction and career 
Gromkiy was laid down on 17 February 2012, and launched on 28 July 2017 by Amur Shipyard in Komsomolsk. On February 7, 2018, the ship's readiness was 84%. At the end of May, the crew arrived at the Amur shipyard. In June, the occupation of the ship was started to ensure its sea trials and acceptance of the ship from the shipbuilder. In August, he was transferred to Vladivostok for testing. She was commissioned on 25 December 2018.

On 15 November 2019, Gromkiy conducted a live fire test in the Sea of Japan.

Between 3 and 10 June 2022, Gromkiy, along with destroyer Admiral Panteleyev, corvettes Sovershennyy, Aldar Tsydenzhapov and intelligence ship Marshal Krylov, took part in naval exercises in the Pacific Ocean. More than 40 warships and support vessels, as well as around 20 aircraft, were involved in the exercises.

Gallery

References 

2017 ships
Ships built by Amur Shipbuilding Plant
Naval ships of Russia
Steregushchiy-class corvettes